Pankovo may refer to:

 Pankovo, Yelovsky District, Perm Krai, rural locality in Dubrovskoye Rural Settlement, Yelovsky District, Perm Krai, Russia
 Pankovo (Petrovac), village situated in Petrovac na Mlavi municipality in Serbia
 Pankovo, Belozersky District, Vologda Oblast, rural locality in Belozersky District, Vologda Oblast, Russia
 Pankovo, Mezhdurechensky District, Vologda Oblast, rural locality in Sukhonskoye Rural Settlement, Mezhdurechensky District, Vologda Oblast, Russia
 Pankovo, Vozhegodsky District, Vologda Oblast, rural locality in Beketovskoye Rural Settlement, Vozhegodsky District, Vologda Oblast, Russia